Hard Choices 'What happened on Algol?' is a 32-page graphic novella prequel to Ultramarines: A Warhammer 40,000 Movie written by Dan Abnett, released as part of the Special Edition DVD on 29 November 2010.
Hard Choices is a military science fiction story set in the Warhammer 40,000 universe, the protagonists being Space Marines from the Ultramarines Chapter.

Art
Penciling was done by comic book artist David Roach, whose past work has included 2000 AD, Marvel Comics, DC Comics, Dark Horse Comics, and the gaming company Wizards of the Coast.

Production
Hard Choices 'What happened on Algol?''' was commissioned to accompany Ultramarines : A Warhammer 40,000 Movie, made by UK-based production company Codex Pictures under licence from Games Workshop, working in association with Good Story Productions Ltd  and Montreal based POP6 Studios.

ReleaseHard Choices 'What happened on Algol?''' accompanies The Special Edition Ultramarines: A Warhammer 40,000 Movie DVD, released worldwide on 29 November 2010.

References

External links
 
 Official Production Blog
 Official YouTube Channel
 Official Twitter
 Official Flickr
 Facebook fan page

2010 graphic novels
2010 comics debuts
Comics based on films
Comics by Dan Abnett
British graphic novels
Warhammer 40,000 comics